Arbuckle is a surname. Notable people with the surname include:

Andrew Arbuckle (born 1944), Scottish Liberal Democrat politician
Andrew Arbuckle (actor) (1887–1938), American actor, brother of Macklyn and cousin of Roscoe
Charles Arbuckle (born 1968), American football player
David Arbuckle (born 1973), Scottish footballer
Ernest C. Arbuckle  (1912–1986), American business leader
Gary Arbuckle (born 1984), Scottish football player
James Arbuckle (1700 – c. 1742), Irish poet
John Arbuckle (businessman) (1838–1912), American businessman
John Arbuckle (politician), see 15th General Assembly of Prince Edward Island
Jon Arbuckle, fictional owner of Garfield the cat
Macklyn Arbuckle (1866–1931), American actor, brother of Andrew and cousin of Roscoe
Matthew Arbuckle Sr. (1740-1781), American military officer of the 18th Century
Matthew Arbuckle Jr. (1778–1851), American military officer of the 19th Century
Phillip Arbuckle (1883–1932), American football coach
Roscoe "Fatty" Arbuckle (1887–1933), American silent film comedian
Samuel Arbuckle (1804–1874), Californian politician
Steve Arbuckle, Canadian actor
Tiffany Arbuckle, the name of Christian singer Plumb